is a Japanese kickboxer, currently competing in the featherweight division of K-1. As an amateur, Kaneda won the 2017 K-1 super featherweight Koshien tournament. 

As of January 2022 he was the #3 ranked Bantamweight kickboxer in the world by both Beyond Kick and Combat Press.

Biography and career

Early career

HEAT & RKS champion
Kaneda made his professional debut against Makoto a.k.a BASTA at RKS Seriken Bousou Taifuu Densetsu vol.1 on March 6, 2016. He won the fight by unanimous decision. He would win three more professional bouts, all by decision, before entering the 2017 K-1 super featherweight Koshien tournament in the -60 kg weight class. He overcame Ryunosuke Nakasuji, Taketo Nukui and Yutaro Shimizu in the first three rounds of the tournament, which all took place on July 29, 2017. These three victories earned him a place in the finals, which took place at K-1 World GP 2017 on November 23, 2017. He captured the tournament title with a unanimous decision win against Tomoya Yokoyama.

As he returned to professional competition, Kaneda faced Ryo Sakoi for the vacant RKS Super Featherweight title at RKS Gold Rush III on December 16, 2018. He won the title by a second-round knockout. Three months later, at HEAT 44 on March 2, 2019, Kaneda took part in the 2019 HEAT Lightweight tournament. He was given a walk-over to the finals, as his semi-final opponent Chao Rogate was disqualified for coming in overweight, and faced Henry Cejas in the finals of the one-day tournament. Kaneda won the title by split decision, after an extra fourth round was contested.

Kaneda made his first RSK super featherweight title defense against Chen Yuxi at RKS Gold Rush IV on May 12, 2019. He retained the title by a first-round technical knockout. Kaneda next faced the former Lumpinee Stadium flyweight champion Chao Rocket in a non-title bout at HEAT 45 on July 28, 2019. He won the fight by a second-round technical knockout. Kaneda made his second RSK super featherweight title defense against Chonbon at RKS Gold Rush V on October 20, 2019. He retained the title by unanimous decision.

Kaneda made his first HEAT lightweight title defense against Henry Cejas at HEAT 46 on January 16, 2020. The pair first faced each other at HEAT 44 on March 2, 2019, with Kaneda winning the bout by split decision. He lost the rematch however, as he was floored by a left hook at the 1:00 minute mark of the second round.

Kaneda made his third RKS super featherweight title defense against Yusuke at RKS Gold Rush VI on April 5, 2020. He won the fight by a third-round knockout. Kaneda was booked to make his fourth RKS title defense against Kaito Sakaguchi at RKS GOLD RUSH VII on November 29, 2020. He lost the fight by majority decision, with scores of 29–28, 29–29 and 30–29.

ACCEL featherweight champion
After suffering the third loss of his professional career, Kaneda moved down to featherweight. In his first fight at a new weight, Kaneda was booked to face Koki Oomae for the ACCEL Featherweight title at ACCEL 50 on December 27, 2020. He won the fight by a first-round knockout. 

Kaneda next made his KNOCK OUT debut against Shogo Kuriaki at KNOCK OUT-EX vol.1 on April 4, 2021. He won the fight by majority decision, with scores of 29–29, 30–29 and 29–28. Kaneda faced Takashi Oiwa at RKS GOLD RUSH VIII on July 11, 2021, in his second and final fight of the year. He won the bout by a first-round knockout, flooring Oiwa with a head kick near the end of the opening round.

K-1
Kaneda was booked to make his Krush debut against Ryuto at Krush 133 on January 28, 2022. He had trouble making weight at the official weigh-ins, as he came in 500 g over the featherweight (-57.5 kg) limit, but was able to weigh in below the limit at the second weigh-in. Kaneda won the fight by unanimous decision, with two scorecards of 30–28 and one scorecard of 30–27.

Kaneda faced Yuta Hayashi at Krush.138 on June 17, 2022. He won the fight by unanimous decision, with scores of 30–29, 30–28 and 30–27. Kaneda would then briefly return to RKS, in order to face Fuya Hirai for the vacant RKS Featherweight title at RKS GOLD RUSH VII on September 4, 2022. He needed just 46 seconds to stop Hirai and capture the vacant championship.

Kaneda faced the former K-1 featherweight champion Tatsuya Tsubakihara at K-1 World GP 2022 in Osaka on December 3, 2022, in what was his K-1 debut. He won the fight by unanimous decision, with all three judges scoring the bout 30–26 in his favor. Kaneda was able to knock Tsubakihara twice during the contest, once in the second and once in the third round.

Titles and accomplishments
Professional
ACCEL
 2020 ACCEL Featherweight Championship
HEAT
 2019 HEAT Kick Lightweight Championship
Real Kakutou Spirits
 2018 RKS Super Featherweight Championship
 2022 RKS Featherweight Championship

Amateur
 2017 K-1 Koshien -60kg Championship

Karate
 2019 FIKA Seidokaikan All Japan Adidas Cup Full Contact plus -60kg Winner
 2012 Pro-Karate do Kakutou Budo All Japan Championship Middle School Winner

Kickboxing record

|-  style="background:#cfc"
| 2022-12-03|| Win ||align=left| Tatsuya Tsubakihara ||  K-1 World GP 2022 in Osaka || Osaka, Japan || Decision (Unanimous) || 3 || 3:00 

|-  style="text-align:center; background:#cfc;"
| 2022-09-04|| Win || align=left| Fuya Hirai || RKS GOLD RUSH VII|| Osaka, Japan || TKO || 1 || 0:46 
|-
! style=background:white colspan=9 |

|-  style="text-align:center; background:#cfc;"
| 2022-06-17 || Win || align=left| Yuta Hayashi ||  Krush.138  || Tokyo, Japan || Decision (Unanimous)||3  ||3:00  

|-  style="text-align:center; background:#cfc;"
| 2022-01-28|| Win || align=left| Ryuto || Krush 133|| Tokyo, Japan || Decision (Unanimous)||3  ||3:00 

|-  style="text-align:center; background:#cfc;"
| 2021-07-11|| Win || align=left| Takashi Oiwa || RKS GOLD RUSH VIII|| Osaka, Japan || KO (High kick)|| 1 || 2:37

|-  style="text-align:center; background:#cfc;"
| 2021-04-04|| Win ||align=left| Shogo Kuriaki || KNOCK OUT-EX vol.1 || Tokyo, Japan || Decision (Majority) || 3 || 3:00

|-  style="text-align:center; background:#CCFFCC;"
| 2020-12-27|| Win ||align=left| Koki Oomae || ACCEL 50 || Kobe, Japan || KO (Right cross) || 1 || 1:43  
|-
! style=background:white colspan=9 |

|-  style="text-align:center; background:#fbb;"
| 2020-11-29|| Loss || align=left| Kaito || RKS GOLD RUSH VII|| Osaka, Japan || Decision (Majority) || 3 || 3:00 
|-
! style=background:white colspan=9 |

|-  style="text-align:center; background:#CCFFCC;"
| 2020-04-05|| Win ||align=left| Yusuke || RKS Gold Rush VI || Osaka, Japan || KO || 3 ||  
|-
! style=background:white colspan=9 |

|-  style="text-align:center; background:#fbb;"
| 2020-01-16|| Loss ||align=left| Henry Cejas|| HEAT 46 || Tokyo, Japan || KO (Left hook) || 2 || 1:00
|-
! style=background:white colspan=9 |

|-  style="text-align:center; background:#CCFFCC;"
| 2019-10-20|| Win ||align=left| Chonbon || RKS Gold Rush V || Osaka, Japan || Decision (Unanimous) || 3 || 3:00 
|-
! style=background:white colspan=9 |

|-  style="text-align:center; background:#CCFFCC;"
| 2019-07-28|| Win ||align=left| Chao Rocket|| HEAT 45  || Nagoya, Japan || KO || 2 || 

|-  style="text-align:center; background:#CCFFCC;"
| 2019-05-12|| Win ||align=left| Chen Yuxi || RKS Gold Rush IV || Osaka, Japan || TKO || 1 || 
|-
! style=background:white colspan=9 |

|-  style="text-align:center; background:#cfc;"
| 2019-03-02|| Win ||align=left| Henry Cejas|| HEAT 44, Tournament Final || Nagoya, Japan || Ext.R Decision (Split) || 4 || 3:00
|-
! style=background:white colspan=9 |

|-  style="text-align:center; background:#CCFFCC;"
| 2018-12-16|| Win ||align=left| Ryo Sakoi || RKS Gold Rush III || Osaka, Japan || KO (Head kick) || 2 || 2:15 
|-
! style=background:white colspan=9 |

|-  style="text-align:center; background:#FFBBBB;"
| 2018-09-29|| Loss ||align=left| Zhao Chongyang || World Boxing Championship || Ankang, China || TKO (Knee to the head) || 3 || 2:05 

|-  style="text-align:center; background:#CCFFCC;"
| 2018-05-20|| Win ||align=left| Okami || MAJKF RKS Gold Rush II || Osaka, Japan || Decision || 3 || 3:00  

|-  style="text-align:center; background:#CCFFCC;"
| 2017-05-28|| Win ||align=left| Naoki Morizono || MAJKF || Osaka, Japan || Decision (Unanimous)|| 3 || 3:00

|-  style="text-align:center; background:#CCFFCC;"
| 2017-04-02|| Win ||align=left| Ippei || RKS All Japan || Osaka, Japan || Decision (Split) || 3 || 3:00

|-  style="text-align:center; background:#CCFFCC;"
| 2016-10-02|| Win ||align=left| Kanta Tabuchi || MAJKF THE ONE AND ONLY || Osaka, Japan || Decision (Unanimous) || 3 || 3:00

|-  style="text-align:center; background:#CCFFCC;"
| 2016-03-06|| Win ||align=left| Makoto a.k.a BASTA || RKS Seriken Bousou Taifuu Densetsu vol.1|| Osaka, Japan || Decision (Unanimous) || 3 || 3:00

|-
| colspan=9 | Legend:    

|-  style="text-align:center; background:#CCFFCC;"
| 2017-11-23|| Win || align=left| Tomoya Yokoyama || K-1 World GP 2017 - Koshien Tournament, Final || Tokyo, Japan || Decision (Unanimous) || 3 ||2:00
|-
! style=background:white colspan=9 |

|-  style="text-align:center; background:#CCFFCC;"
| 2017-07-29|| Win || align=left| Yutaro Shimizu || 2017 K-1 Koshien Tournament, Semi Final|| Tokyo, Japan || Decision (Majority) || 1 ||2:00

|-  style="text-align:center; background:#CCFFCC;"
| 2017-07-29|| Win || align=left| Taketo Nukui || 2017 K-1 Koshien Tournament, Quarter Final || Tokyo, Japan || Decision || 1 ||2:00

|-  style="text-align:center; background:#CCFFCC;"
| 2017-07-29|| Win || align=left| Ryunosuke Nakasuji || 2017 K-1 Koshien Tournament, First Round || Tokyo, Japan || Decision (Unanimous)|| 1 ||2:00

|-  style="text-align:center; background:#FFBBBB;"
| 2016-07-30|| Loss || align=left| Taiyo Sugiyama || 2016 K-1 Koshien Tournament, Second Round || Tokyo, Japan || Ext.R Decision (Split) || 2 || 2:00

|-  style="text-align:center; background:#CCFFCC;"
| 2016-07-30|| Win || align=left| Katsuya Kozuru || 2016 K-1 Koshien Tournament, First Round || Tokyo, Japan || TKO ||  ||

|-  style="text-align:center; background:#CCFFCC;"
| 2015-11-15|| Win ||align=left|  || RKS Double Blade 2 || Osaka, Japan || KO || 2 || 

|-  style="text-align:center; background:#CCFFCC;"
| 2014-11-02|| Win ||align=left| Takuma Hamamoto || RKS Double Clutch 3 || Osaka, Japan || Decision (Unanimous)|| 2 ||2:00 

|-  style="text-align:center; background:#CCFFCC;"
| 2013-12-08|| Win || align=left| Kazuki Uehara || MAJKF RKS || Osaka, Japan || Decision|| 1 ||2:00

|-  style="text-align:center; background:#c5d2ea;"
| 2013-08-04|| Draw|| align=left| Tsubasa Yoshikawa || GLADIATOR 58 || Osaka, Japan || Decision|| 2 ||2:00

|-  style="text-align:center; background:#CCFFCC;"
| 2013-06-09|| Win || align=left| Kazuya Oohara || Chakuriki Gold Rush 2 Double Blade || Osaka, Japan || Decision (Unanimous)|| 2 ||1:30

|-  style="text-align:center; background:#fbb;"
| 2013-03-31|| Loss ||align=left| Begin Yoshioka || Chakuriki Gold Rush in RKS || Osaka, Japan || Decision (Split)|| 2 ||2:00 

|-  style="text-align:center; background:#FFBBBB;"
| 2012-09-02|| Loss || align=left| Kazane Nagai || KJC || Osaka, Japan || Decision|| 2 || 1:30

|-  style="text-align:center; background:#FFBBBB;"
| 2012-08-19|| Loss || align=left| Takumi Naito || J-NETWORK - J-GROW 42 School Wars || Tokyo, Japan || KO|| 1 ||

|-  style="text-align:center; background:#FFBBBB;"
| 2012-07-15|| Loss || align=left| Kazane Nagai || Kyoken Jr Kick || Osaka, Japan||Decision|| 2 || 1:30

|-  style="text-align:center; background:#c5d2ea;"
| 2012-05-20|| Draw|| align=left| Kakyo Sakai || Kyoken Jr Kick|| Osaka, Japan || Decision|| 1 ||2:00

|-  style="text-align:center; background:#CCFFCC;"
| 2012-05-20|| Win || align=left| Riki Oono || Kyoken Jr Kick|| Osaka, Japan || Decision|| 1 ||2:00

|-  style="text-align:center; background:#fbb;"
| 2012-04-15|| Loss || align=left| Ryusei Shimizu || Chakuriki Fighting Gala 5 || Osaka, Japan || Decision (Unanimous)|| 1 ||1:30

|-  style="text-align:center; background:#CCFFCC;"
| 2012-03-11|| Win || align=left| Takahira || Kyoken Jr Kick || Osaka, Japan || Decision|| 2 ||1:30

|-
| colspan=9 | Legend:

See also
 List of male kickboxers

References

Living people
1999 births
Japanese male kickboxers
21st-century Japanese people
Sportspeople from Osaka